Saint-Just (pronounced Saint-Ju) is a quarter in the 5th arrondissement of Lyon, on the Fourvière hill. Louise of Savoy, the mother of Francis I of France, had her headquarters at the local monastery when Regent.

References

5th arrondissement of Lyon
Quarters of Lyon